Mendeleyevo is the name of several inhabited localities in Russia.

Urban localities
Mendeleyevo, Moscow Oblast, a work settlement in Solnechnogorsky District of Moscow Oblast

Rural localities
Mendeleyevo, Kaliningrad Oblast, a settlement in Dobrinsky Rural Okrug of Guryevsky District of Kaliningrad Oblast
Mendeleyevo, Perm Krai, a rural locality classified as a "settlement at the station" in Karagaysky District of Perm Krai

Historical localities
Mendeleyevo, formerly an inhabited locality; now Mendeleyevo Microdistrict—a part of the city of Kaliningrad, Kaliningrad Oblast